Sellaite is a magnesium fluoride mineral with the formula MgF2. It crystallizes in the tetragonal crystal system, typically as clear to white vitreous prisms. It may be fibrous and occur as radiating aggregates. It has a Mohs hardness of 5 to 6 and a specific gravity of 2.97 to 3.15. Refractive index values are nω = 1.378 and nε = 1.390.

Discovery and occurrence
Sellaite was first described in 1868 and named for Italian mining engineer and mineralogist Quintino Sella (1827–1884).

References

 Palache, C., H. Berman, and C. Frondel (1951) Dana’s system of mineralogy, (7th edition), v. II, pp. 37–39

Magnesium minerals
Fluorine minerals
Tetragonal minerals
Minerals in space group 136